Franz Kobell (23 November 1749 in Mannheim – 14 January 1822 in Munich) was a German painter, etcher and draftsman.

Biography
The Elector Karl Theodor of Bavaria sent him to Italy (1776) to study art and he remained there till 1785, working from nature and monumental buildings, mainly in Rome. He next lived at Munich, where he became painter to the court.

Works
He produced only a few oil paintings, highly praised by Goethe, a notable example being “Rocky landscape with waterfalls,” once in the Bamberg gallery. Endowed as he was with an exuberant fancy and extraordinary facility of production, the process of painting proved too slow to keep pace with his ideas, and he mostly confined himself to the use of pen and pencil, leaving 20,000 landscape and architecture pen drawings and etchings.

Family
He was the brother of Ferdinand Kobell.

Notes

References
Attribution
 
 

1749 births
1822 deaths
18th-century German painters
18th-century German male artists
German male painters
19th-century German painters
19th-century German male artists
German etchers